Phylus melanocephalus is a European species of plant bugs belonging to the family Miridae, subfamily Phylinae. Its colour ranges from orange to greenish-brown and its head may be pale or dark.

"Phylus palliceps"
Paler specimens of P. melanocephalus were long referred to as separate species Phylus palliceps, distinguished in particular by having a pale head, P. melanocephalus being restricted to insects with a dark head. Pagola-Carte et al. (2005) found no morphological or habitat differences between specimens referred to the two supposed species, and a continuous gradation of colour, and concluded the two should be synonymised.

References

Insects described in 1767
Taxa named by Carl Linnaeus